1957 Emperor's Cup Final was the 37th final of the Emperor's Cup competition. The final was played at Hiroshima Kokutaiji High School Stadium in Hiroshima on May 6, 1957. Chudai Club won the championship.

Overview
Chudai Club won their 1st title, by defeating Toyo Industries 2–1.

Match details

See also
1957 Emperor's Cup

References

Emperor's Cup
1957 in Japanese football
Sanfrecce Hiroshima matches